Pierre-Emile Kordt Højbjerg (born 5 August 1995) is a Danish professional footballer who plays as a midfielder for Premier League club Tottenham Hotspur and the Denmark national team.

Højbjerg started his career as a youth for Danish clubs BK Skjold, Kjøbenhavns Boldklub and Brøndby IF before joining German club Bayern Munich in 2012. He made his senior debut for the reserves that year and his professional debut for the first team in April 2013; at 17 he was the club's youngest player in the Bundesliga. He made 25 total appearances for Bayern and won a variety of domestic and international tournaments, also having loans at fellow league teams FC Augsburg and Schalke 04. In 2016, he signed a five-year contract for Southampton for an estimated £12.8 million fee. After making 134 appearances for the Saints, he joined Tottenham Hotspur in 2020 for a reported initial fee of £15 million.

Højbjerg was a youth international at various levels from under-16 to under-21. He made his debut for the Denmark national team in 2014, and represented the side at UEFA Euro 2020 and the 2022 FIFA World Cup.

Club career

Early career
While initially playing for BK Skjold and Kjøbenhavns Boldklub he moved to Brøndby IF as a junior player at age 14. He looks upon Zinedine Zidane as his role model. Aged just 5, Højbjerg began attending training sessions with his six-year-old brother at local club Skjold. He was deployed as a striker by Copenhagen. Starting from his debut, Højbjerg plays as a central midfielder and sometimes right wide midfielder. He has since switched to a defensive midfield role.

In 2011, Højbjerg was honoured with the title "Danish under-17 player of the year". In 2013, he was honoured with the title "Danish talent of the year" by Spillerforeningen.

Bayern Munich

Højbjerg joined Bayern in July 2012 and, at the age of 17 years and 251 days, made his professional debut on 13 April 2013 in the Bundesliga against 1. FC Nürnberg, as a substitute for Xherdan Shaqiri and thus became the youngest player ever to play for the Bayern Munich first team in the Bundesliga. He finished the 2012–13 season with no goals in two matches played for the first team and eight goals in 30 matches played for the reserve team.

In December of that year, he was in the Bayern squad which won the 2013 FIFA Club World Cup in Morocco, although he did not enter the field of play during the tournament. On 17 May 2014, Højbjerg started the DFB-Pokal final for Bayern Munich, a 2–0 extra-time win over Borussia Dortmund. He played for a total of 102 minutes before being substituted in the first half of extra time for Daniel Van Buyten. He finished the 2013–14 season with seven Bundesliga appearances and two German Cup appearances for the first team and four goals from 14 appearances for the reserve team.

His first match of the 2014–15 season was the DFL-Supercup on 13 August, playing the first hour and then being substituted for Mario Götze, as Bayern lost 2–0 at Borussia Dortmund. On 8 January 2015, Bayern extended Højbjerg's contract to 2018. He finished the 2014–15 season with no goals from eight Bundesliga appearances, one German Cup appearance, and three Champions League appearances. On 7 January 2015, Højbjerg was loaned to Bundesliga team FC Augsburg for the remainder of the 2014–15 season. He made his debut on 1 February against 1899 Hoffenheim. Højbjerg scored his first Bundesliga goal on 11 April against SC Paderborn 07 in a 2–1 loss. On 9 May, he assisted Raúl Bobadilla for the only goal as Augsburg won away at Bayern, who had already won the league by that point. He finished his loan spell with two goals from 16 Bundesliga appearances.

On 28 August 2015, Højbjerg joined fellow Bundesliga side Schalke 04 on a season-long loan. He played 30 games for the Gelsenkirchen-based club, including six in the Europa League, and at the end of the season he told Danish newspaper B.T. that the time had arrived to leave Bayern Munich and become a first-team regular elsewhere.

Southampton

On 11 July 2016, Højbjerg joined English club Southampton on a five-year deal for an estimated fee of £12.8 million. He made his debut in the Premier League on 13 August as the season began with a 1–1 home draw with Watford, coming on in the 55th minute in place of James Ward-Prowse. BBC Sport's Neil Johnston wrote that he "injected pace and urgency" into the Saints, "was not afraid to shoot and was hard-working". Although he played all five matches on the way to the 2017 EFL Cup Final, Højbjerg was an unused substitute in the match at Wembley Stadium, which Southampton lost 3–2 to Manchester United.

Højbjerg scored his first goal for the Saints in his 54th match on 18 March 2018, opening a 2–0 win at League One club Wigan Athletic in the sixth round of the FA Cup, the first match under new manager Mark Hughes. In December that year, Hughes' successor Ralph Hasenhüttl made him the Saints' captain. However in June 2020, Hojbjerg was stripped of the captaincy after publicly speaking about his desire to leave the club, with Ward-Prowse replacing him as captain.

Tottenham Hotspur

On 11 August 2020, Højbjerg joined Tottenham Hotspur on a five-year deal, for a reported initial fee of £15 million plus add-ons.

He made his debut on 13 September in a 1–0 home defeat by Everton. Despite this early setback, Højbjerg soon became a key member of José Mourinho's squad in the central defensive midfield position, earning wide praise for his performance in many games, as well as receiving a nomination as Premier League Player of the Month for November. On 28 January 2021, Højbjerg scored his first goal for Spurs in the Premier League with a 20-yard strike at a 3–1 home loss to Liverpool. He made the most appearances ever by a player in the 2020–21 season (3420 minutes).

On 1 November 2022, he scored a goal in the 95th minute in a 2–1 away win over Marseille, in which Tottenham Hotspur finished top of Group D in the 2022–23 Champions League season.

International career
Højbjerg was born in Denmark to a Danish father and French mother. He was called up to the Denmark senior side for the first time in May 2014 for friendlies against Hungary and Sweden and made his debut against Sweden on 28 May, playing the full 90 minutes. On his third cap on 7 September 2014 he scored his first international goal, equalising as Denmark began their UEFA Euro 2016 qualification campaign with a 2–1 win over Armenia in Copenhagen.

In May 2018, he was named in Denmark's preliminary 35-man squad for the 2018 FIFA World Cup in Russia, although he did not make the final 23.

Højbjerg was named in the Danish squad for the delayed UEFA Euro 2020 in June 2021. In their opening match, a 1–0 loss to Finland, he missed a penalty; the game had been stopped and resumed due to Christian Eriksen's medical emergency.

Personal life
Højbjerg was born in Copenhagen and grew up in the Østerbro district of the city. He is the second of three children. Højbjerg was introduced to football when he was five years old. Højbjerg's father Christian died of stomach cancer in April 2014, five days after his first start for Bayern.

Career statistics

Club

International

As of match played 6 June 2022. Denmark's score listed first, score column indicates score after each Højbjerg goal.

Honours
Bayern Munich
 Bundesliga: 2012–13, 2013–14
 DFB-Pokal: 2013–14
 FIFA Club World Cup: 2013
 
Southampton
EFL Cup runner-up: 2016–17

Tottenham Hotspur
EFL Cup runner-up: 2020–21

Individual
DBU's Talentpris 2011: Danish under-17 player of the year
Spillerforeningen 2013: Danish talent of the year
 Danish Talent of the Year: 2014
 UEFA European Championship Team of the Tournament: 2020
 Danish Football Player of the Year: 2022

References

External links

Profile at the Tottenham Hotspur F.C. website
Danish national team profile 

1995 births
Living people
Footballers from Copenhagen
Danish men's footballers
Danish people of French descent
Denmark youth international footballers
Denmark under-21 international footballers
Denmark international footballers
Association football midfielders
FC Bayern Munich footballers
FC Bayern Munich II players
FC Augsburg players
FC Schalke 04 players
Southampton F.C. players
Bundesliga players
Premier League players
UEFA Euro 2020 players
Danish expatriate men's footballers
Danish expatriate sportspeople in Germany
Danish expatriate sportspeople in England
Expatriate footballers in Germany
Expatriate footballers in England
Østerbro
2022 FIFA World Cup players